The Department of Environment and Natural Resources (DENR or KKLY) is the executive department of the Philippine government responsible for governing and supervising the exploration, development, utilization, and conservation of the country's natural resources.

History of the DENR
The Department of Environment and Natural Resources was first established on January 1, 1917, as the Department of Agriculture and Natural Resources (DANR) through the enactment of Act No. 2666 by the Philippine Commission, otherwise known as "An Act to Re-organize the Executive Department of the Government of the Philippine Islands," on November 18, 1916. In 1932, the DANR was reorganized into the Department of Agriculture and Commerce (DAC).

In 1947, a reorganization act changed the DAC back to the Department of Agriculture and Natural Resources. The Natural Resources arm of the DANR was finally spun off on May 17, 1974, as the Ministry of Natural Resources. On January 30, 1987, the ministry was reorganized into the Department of Environment, Energy and Natural Resources, by Executive Order No. 131 and was finally reorganized into the Department of Environment and Natural Resources by Executive Order No. 192 on June 10, 1987. DENR worked on large-scale reforestation of Davao City under the national greening program (NGP), its flagship project that lasted for a period of six years, from 2011 to 2016.

List of the Secretaries of the Department of Environment and Natural Resources

Bureaus

Attached agencies
 Laguna Lake Development Authority
 National Mapping and Resource Information Authority
 National Water Resources Board
 Natural Resources Development Corporation
 Palawan Council for Sustainable Development
 Philippine Mining Development Corporation

See also 
 Environmental issues in the Philippines

References

External links
Department of Environment and Natural Resources website
Environmental Legal Assistance Center, Inc. website
Mines and Geosciences Bureau

Philippines
Philippines
 
Philippines, Environment and Natural Resources
Environment and Natural Resources